Klawock Seaplane Base  is a public use seaplane base owned by and located in Klawock, a city in the Prince of Wales-Hyder Census Area of the U.S. state of Alaska. It is included in the National Plan of Integrated Airport Systems for 2011–2015, which categorized it as a general aviation facility.

Facilities 
Klawock Seaplane Base has one runway designated NW/SE with a water surface measuring 5,000 by 1,000 feet (1,524 x 305 m).

Airlines and non-stop destinations 
No airlines currently have scheduled service to the Klawock Seaplane Base.

See also 
 Klawock Airport (IATA: KLW, ICAO: PAKW, FAA: AKW) located at

References

External links 

 Topographic map from USGS The National Map

Airports in the Prince of Wales–Hyder Census Area, Alaska
Seaplane bases in Alaska